Pathanke Cheema is a small village located to the west of Ahmad Nagar Chattha, Tehsial Wazirabad, Gujranwala District, Punjab, Pakistan. For education Government Boys Primary School (Combined) is functional, by Government of Punjab, Pakistan under Board of Intermediate and Secondary Education, Gujranwala. For Basic Essentials People visit Ahmad Nagar Chattha. The only way to get to Pathanke Cheema is by Road. Pathanke Cheema is directly connected with Ahmad Nagar Chattha on east side and on west side with Kub Pora Cheema. In the village 80% population is Muslim and 20% in Christian. Most of people doing farming, whole some has their own small shops for daily needs.

See also 

 Mohlunke
 Kub Pora Cheema
 Chabba Cheema

References 

Villages in Gujranwala District